The 2020 U Sports Women's Volleyball Championship was scheduled to be held March 13–15, 2020, in Calgary, Alberta, to determine a national champion for the 2019–20 U Sports women's volleyball season. The tournament was cancelled on the first day that games were scheduled to be played due to the COVID-19 pandemic. This was the first time that a national championship had not been played since it was first unofficially contested in 1970.

The entire tournament was to be played at Jack Simpson Gymnasium at the University of Calgary. It would have been the fifth time that Calgary had hosted the tournament with the most recent occurring in 2007.

Participating teams

Championship bracket

Consolation bracket

References

External links 
 Tournament Web Site

U Sports volleyball
2020 in women's volleyball
University of Calgary